Davlameti is a census town in Nagpur district  in the state of Maharashtra, India.

Demographics
 India census, Davlameti had a population of 8807. Males constitute 52% of the population and females 48%. Davlameti has an average literacy rate of 77%, higher than the national average of 59.5%: male literacy is 86% and, female literacy is 67%. In Davlameti, 13% of the population is under 6 years of age.

References

Cities and towns in Nagpur district